The House of Shakhovskoy (alt. Shahovskoy, Shahovskoi) is the name of a princely Russian family descending from the Rurik Dynasty, and as such, one of the oldest noble families of the Russian Empire. Most members of the family fled the Russian Empire in 1917 during the Russian Revolution.

In the 19th century, and especially after the abolition of serfdom, the "Shakhovskoy" surname began to appear among peasants who adopted their employers' name but were not themselves descendants of the princely family.

Family history
The family was founded by Prince Konstantin Glebovich, nicknamed "Shah". Konstantin was a direct agnatic descendant of Rurik, whose dynasty formed ancient Rus' and ruled from the 9th to the 17th century. At the time, the land comprised many city-states and principalities, each of which was ruled by its own prince, or knyaz. The Rurik dynasty brought these together under the authority of the Grand Duchy of Kiev and later Moscow. The land would later become modern-day Russia, Belarus, and Ukraine.

The family also descends cognatically from Ivan I of Moscow, through the latter's daughter Evdokia Ivanovna Moskovskaya (1314–1342), who married Vasili Mikhailovich, Prince of Yaroslavl (died 1345). They were the great-grandparents of Andrej and Jurij, the first Shakhovskoy princes. This branch is the most senior extant branch of the Rurikids, with many Shakhovskoys living outside of Russia after having fled during the Russian Revolution.

Pedigree from Rurik

 Rurik (835–879), prince and founder of ancient Rus'
 Igor of Kiev (878–946), prince of Kievan Rus
 Sviatoslav I (942–972), grand prince of Kievan Rus
 Vladimir the Great (956–1015), grand prince of Kievan Rus
 Yaroslav the Wise (978–1054), grand prince of Veliky Novgorod and Kievan Rus
 Vsevolod I of Kiev (1030–1093), grand prince of Kievan Rus
 Vladimir II Monomakh (1053–1125), grand prince of Kievan Rus 
 Mstislav I of Kiev (1076–1132), grand prince of Kievan Rus
 Rostislav I of Kiev (1110–1168), grand prince of Kievan Rus
 Davyd Rostislavich (1140–1197), prince of Smolensk
 Mstislav Davydovich (1193–1230), prince of Smolensk
 Rostislav III Mstislavovich, prince of Kiev and Smolensk
 Fedor Rostislavovich “Chernyi” (died 1299), prince of Smolensk and Yaroslavl
 Davyd Fedorovich (died 1321), prince of Yaroslavl
 Vasili Davydovich (died 1345), prince of Yaroslavl
 Gleb Vasilievich, prince of Yaroslavl
 Konstantin Glebovich "Shah", prince of Yaroslavl

Prince Konstantin Glebovich "Shah"
Prince Konstantin was the youngest of three sons of Prince Gleb Vasilievich, whose brother Vasili Vasilievich ruled the Principality of Yaroslavl. The rule was passed down to Vasili's sons.

Nevertheless, Konstantin managed to earn the nickname "Shakh" - from Persian "Shah", meaning king. He eventually moved to the Grand Duchy of Moscow and held service under the high prince. In 1482, Konstantin appears as a voivode in Nizhny Novgorod. His sons, princes Andrei and Yuri, also held their service in Moscow. In the 16th century, the descendants of Andrei split into eight primary branches.

Military & government service
As was true of many nobles, and particularly of those descending from Rurik, members of the Shakhovskoy family held high ranking leadership positions throughout Russia's history. They frequently appear in the role of voivode, literally "war-leader" or "war-lord", denoting principal command of a military force. When not performing military service, members of the family often held roles of senator or judge. Aside from a few outliers, the Shakhovskoy family has maintained loyalty to the Grand Prince, later Tsar, and finally Emperor of Russia.

After the Russian Revolution
Most members of the Shakhovskoy family fled their homeland during the Russian Revolution of 1917. Today, many who bear the name are descendants of peasants who had adopted the surname of their employers. Of the princely family, there are several known descendants in France, in Italy and in other parts of the world, as well as matrilineal descendants in a branch of the Derugin family.

Title
Members of the Shakhovskoy family bear the title of "prince" (knyaz). Female members bear the title "princess" (knyaginya referring to the wife of a knyaz, and knyazhna referring to the daughter of a knyaz). Originally, the title suggested royal ancestry from a current or former ruling dynasty. From the 18th century onwards, the title was occasionally granted by the Tsar to exceptional persons not descending from a ruling house.

Coat of arms
The first and third sections of the shield are the arms of the Great Duchy of Kiev. The second and fourth sections are the arms of the Principality of Smolensk. In the middle of the arms a smaller shield bears the arms of the Yaroslav Principality.

Notable family members

 Prince Miron Mikhailovich Shakhovskoy (c. 1590 – 1632), voivode in Kargopol, Pskov, Kostroma, Nizhny Novgorod, led an unsuccessful expedition to build a fortress at the mouth of Tara River and to collect taxes in the region, recruited cossacks in Ryazan for government service (8th branch)
 Prince Grigoriy Petrovich Shakhovskoy, political activist during the Time of Troubles, voivode in Putivl, follower of False Dmitri II  (3rd branch)
 Prince Ivan Fedorovich “Bol’shoi” Shakhovskoy (c. 1606 – 1647), voivode in Santschursk, Rylsk, Tomsk, Krapivna, Chern', Tula, Rzhev, Kostroma, Saratov, Tsivilsk, fought in the war against Poland, judge in Vladimir, judge (1st branch)
 Prince Ivan Fedorovich “Men’shoi” Shakhovskoy, Moscow nobleman, voivode in Kostroma, judge (1st branch)
 Prince Semyon Ivanovich “Kharya” Shakhovskoy (late 16th century), poet, author of spiritual literature, liturgical composer, diplomat, voivode of Yeniseysk (3rd branch)
 Prince Yuriy Ivanovich “Kosoi” Shakhovskoy (c. 1612), held victory over the Polish army in 1612, voivode in Mtsensk, Mikhaylov, Tara (2nd branch)
 Prince Mikhail Nikitich Shakhovskoy (c. 1606–1663), voivode of Orlov and Tara (2nd branch)
 Prince Mikhail Semyonovich Shakhovskoy, judge in Moscow and Vladimir (3rd branch)
 Prince Aleksey Ivanovich Shakhovskoy (1688–1752), State Councillor, advisor of Collegium of Justice (2nd branch)
 Prince Aleksey Ivanovich Shakhovskoy (c. 1690 – 1737), senator, General-in-chief, ruler of Malorussia (Ukraine) (branch)
 Prince Yakov Petrovich Shakhovskoy (1705–1777), senator, head of police, General-Prosecutor of the Holy Synod
 Prince Mikhail Ivanovich Shakhovskoy (c. 1753), privy councilor, senator, president of the Collegium of State Income (branch)
 Prince Grigoriy Ivanovich Shakhovskoy (c. 1758, governor of Belgorod, ambassador to Constantinople
 Prince Nikolay Leontievich Shakhovskoy (1777–1860), senator, general-major (6th branch)
 Prince Ivan Leontievich Shakhovskoy (1770–1860), infantry general, member of the Governing Senate (6th branch)
 Prince Aleksandr Aleksandrovich Shakhovskoy (1770–1846), academic of the Academy of Science (3rd branch)
 Prince Aleksei Ivanovich Shakhovskoy (1821–1900), infantry general, hero of Caucasus (6th branch)
 Prince Fedor Petrovich Shakhovskoy (1796–1829), Decembrist (7th branch)
 Prince Dmitriy Ivanovich Shakhovskoy (1861–1939), liberal politician, minister of the Russian Provisional Government (7th branch)
 Prince Konstantin Yakovlevich Shakhovskoy (1905–1972), priest of the Russian Orthodox Church, martyr (3rd branch)
 Archbishop John (Dmitriy Alekseyevich Shahovskoy) (1902–1989), officer of the White Army, writer - pseudonym "Strannik", editor of an emigre literary journal in Paris, Russian Orthodox monk, archbishop of San Francisco and the West in the Orthodox Church in America
 Princess Zinaida Alekseyevna Shahovskaya (1906–2001), author, poet, director of the European publication, "Russian Thought", sister of Dmitriy Alekseyevich Shakhovskoy
 Prince Dmitriy Mikhailovich Shakhovskoy (born 1934), professor of Russian history and philosophy in France. In 2006, Prince Dmitriy had his DNA tested for the Rurikid Dynasty DNA Project, and was found to belong to the N1c1 genetic haplogroup. The Russian Newsweek had later confirmed his result by testing two other princes, namely Prince Andrei Gagarin of Russia and Prince Nikita Lobanov-Rostovsky of Great Britain.

References

Russian noble families
Ukrainian nobility